Hermann Groeber (born 17 July 1865 in Wartenberg, Bavaria; died 24 June 1935 in Gstadt am Chiemsee) was a German painter who was known throughout Germany as a portraitist and landscape artist.

Biography

Hermann Groeber gained early success as a self-employed painter. He joined the German Association of Artists, and after Ludwig Schmid-Reutte was appointed to Karlsruhe, Groeber took over his class of nude acts, which soon enjoyed great popularity. In 1907 he became head of the nude class at the Munich Academy and was appointed full professor there in 1911.

In 1911 he received the Golden Medal in the exhibition in the Munich Glass Palace.

Students
Thomas Baumgartner
Walter Bud
Marius Bunescu
Arnold Fiechter
Hermann Finsterlin
Erwin Henning
Leo Sebastian Humer
Paul Kauzmann
Paul Klee
Hans Lembke
Oswald Malura

External links
Commons : Hermann Groeber  - Collection of images, videos and audio files
Hermann Groeber on artnet

References

19th-century German painters
19th-century German male artists
20th-century German painters
20th-century German male artists
1865 births
1935 deaths